Paul Higgins (born January 13, 1962) is a Canadian retired professional ice hockey right winger who played 25 games in the National Hockey League for the Toronto Maple Leafs during the 1981–82 and 1982–83 seasons.

Early life
Higgins was born in Saint John, New Brunswick. As a student Father Henry Carr Catholic Secondary School in Toronto, he played on the Henry Carr Crusaders.

Career 
Higgins was selected in the 10th round of the 1980 NHL Draft and played for Toronto in the 1981–82 and 1982–83 seasons. His only appearance in the post season was a single game in 1982–83 against the Minnesota North Stars in game four of the Norris Division Semi-Finals at Maple Leaf Gardens. Higgins dressed in favour of the injured Jim Korn. His primary role in hockey was as a fighter and he was compared to the likes of Tiger Williams. In the 25 NHL regular season games that Higgins played, he did not collect a single point but was assessed 152 minutes in penalties.

Career statistics

Regular season and playoffs

References

External links
 

1962 births
Living people
Canadian ice hockey right wingers
Carolina Thunderbirds players
Ice hockey people from New Brunswick
Kitchener Rangers players
Sportspeople from Saint John, New Brunswick
Toronto Maple Leafs draft picks
Toronto Maple Leafs players
Toronto Marlboros players